KakaoBank Corp. (stylized as Kakaobank; Hangul: 주식회사 카카오뱅크) is a South Korean mobile-only bank and financial technology company established in 2016 by Korea Investment Holdings and Kakao Corp.

History
The banking service went public in July 2017 after getting a huge spotlight mainly due to its simplicity and unique and intuitive UI and UX. The bank attracted more than 240,000 customers within the first 24-hour-operation. The mobile app-based lender has achieved more than 10 million customers by July 11, 2019.

As of March 31, 2021, Kakaobank's customer volume is more than 14.2 million.

Valuation 
In October 2020, the corporate valuation of the South Korea’s largest neobank was set around KRW 8.6 trillion through KRW 750 billion-capital, raising from the U.S-based private equity TPG Capital and current shareholders.

IPO 
On September 25, 2020, Kakaobank officially announced its IPO plan to public.
The bank picked KB Security and Credit Suisse as lead managers for its IPO, with Citi as a co-manager.     
According to a local media report, kakaobank would submit the IPO application to a Korean exchange on April 15, 2021.

Services
kakaobank's services include loan, deposit, debit card, overseas remittance and some other financial services.

App
kakaobank provides products via its mobile apps which adopt easy identification (KYC) methods. kakaobank's UI and UX are considered very intuitive. In July 2019, kakaobank's Android app was recognized as No.1 banking app based on MAU and the most downloaded banking app in the country by igaoworks.

References

External links

  
 Official website (English)

Kakao
Online banks
South Korean companies established in 2016
Banks established in 2016
Banks of South Korea